The 58th General Assembly of Prince Edward Island was in session from June 15, 1989, to March 1, 1993. The Liberal Party led by Joe Ghiz formed the government. Catherine Callbeck became party leader and Premier in January 1993 after Ghiz retired from politics.

Edward Clark was elected speaker.

There were four sessions of the 58th General Assembly:

Members

Kings

Prince

Queens

Notes:

References
 Election results for the Prince Edward Island Legislative Assembly, 1989-05-29
 O'Handley, Kathryn Canadian Parliamentary Guide, 1994 

Terms of the General Assembly of Prince Edward Island
1989 establishments in Prince Edward Island
1993 disestablishments in Prince Edward Island